Damian Nichol (born 25 December 1930) is a South African rower. He competed in the men's coxless four event at the 1952 Summer Olympics.

References

1930 births
Living people
South African male rowers
Olympic rowers of South Africa
Rowers at the 1952 Summer Olympics
People from Kroonstad